Wisdom 'Wiz' Kudowor (born September 19, 1957) is a contemporary artist from Ghana.

Kudowor studied at the College of Art, University of Science and Technology, Ghana. He graduated in 1981 with a first class honours degree in fine art.

He has designed and executed public works in Ghana including a relief mural at the Kwame Nkrumah Memorial Park. His works are held in both and public collections, including the Artists Alliance Gallery in Labadi, Accra.

Awards
Bronze prize at the 2001 Osaka Triennial.

Solo exhibitions
Wiz Portfolio: Places at the Artists Alliance Gallery, Accra in 2014, consisting of 84 works.

References

External links
 African Encounters  Wiz Kudowor's west coast representatives
 Gallery of selected Wiz Kudowor artwork
 Wiz Kudowor by Ama de-Graft Aikins
 Kuaba Gallery (short article on Wiz Kudowor)

1957 births
Living people
20th-century Ghanaian painters
20th-century male artists
Male painters
20th-century Ghanaian sculptors
Ghanaian male artists
Male sculptors